ForSight Robotics is an Israeli surgical robotics company. It has developed a surgical robotics platform, ORYOM, to treat widespread eye diseases.

History 
Surgical robotics were pioneered by Intuitive Surgical in the late 1990s and early 2000s, with robotic-assisted surgery used for laparoscopic, cardiac, and gynecological procedures. Companies like MAKO Surgical (acquired by Stryker) and Mazor Robotics (acquired by Medtronic) expanded the use of surgical robotics to orthopedic and spine surgeries, respectively. In identifying the need for integrating surgical robotics into ophthalmology, Dr. Daniel Glozman, Dr. Joseph Nathan, and Professor Moshe Shoham co-founded ForSight Robotics in 2020. Dr. Daniel Glozman is the inventor of XACT Robotics technology, a surgical robotics system for navigating and guiding needle-puncture procedures. Dr. Joseph Nathan previously directed healthcare commercialization activities at the Technion – Israel Institute of Technology. Professor Moshe Shoham is Professor Emeritus of Mechanical Engineering at Technion, and founded Mazor Robotics and Microbot Medical, among other medical robotics companies.

The company’s strategic advisory board includes surgical robotics pioneers, among them Dr. Fredric Moll, founder of Intuitive Surgical and Auris Health, and Rony Abovitz, founder of MAKO Surgical. The company came out of stealth in March 2021 with a $10M seed round led by Eclipse Ventures. In July 2022, ForSight Robotics announced a $55M Series A round led by India’s Adani Group. The company has also been awarded several grants from the Israel Innovation Authority’s Companies Incentives Program.

Surgical Robotics in Ophthalmology 

An estimated 2.2 billion people worldwide suffer from vision impairment and eye diseases. Of them, about 1 billion suffer from preventable vision impairment. Many of the leading causes of blindness can be prevented with timely surgical care, but a global shortage of ophthalmic surgeons leaves millions without access to surgical treatment annually. With a mean of 31.7 ophthalmologists treating a population of 1 million people worldwide, many patients remain untreated and lose their sight. In addition, cataract surgeries are the most common surgical procedure worldwide, with over 28 million surgeries performed annually. In July of 2021, the United Nations General Assembly approved its first-ever resolution on vision, focusing on the global lack of access to proper eye care and highlighting the importance of eye care to achieving the UN’s 2030 Sustainable Development Goals. Further, the worldwide economic and health burden from vision impairment is estimated to cost $3 trillion annually in lost productivity (5). ForSight Robotics’ technology aims to increase access to and democratize quality surgical ophthalmic care, beginning with cataract procedures.

ForSight Robotics has developed ORYOM, the first hybrid intraocular robotic ophthalmic platform. ORYOM is based on advanced computer visualization, AI-based machine learning, and microsurgical robotics utilizing 14 degrees of freedom. Its hybrid kinematic structure allows a reach to any point within the human eye. The company claims that the robotic platform is ten times more accurate than the human hand. Leading voices in ophthalmology point to the heightened precision and accuracy that robotics in eye surgery can provide. To date, there are no robotically-assisted surgical platforms on the market for cataracts, glaucoma, or other widespread retinal diseases.

References 

Israeli brands